The Wainwright Building (also known as the Wainwright State Office Building) is a 10-story,  terra cotta office building at 709 Chestnut Street in downtown St. Louis, Missouri. The Wainwright Building is considered to be one of the first aesthetically fully expressed early skyscrapers. It was designed by Dankmar Adler and Louis Sullivan and built between 1890 and 1891. It was named for local brewer, building contractor, and financier Ellis Wainwright.

The building, listed as a landmark both locally and nationally, is described as "a highly influential prototype of the modern office building" by the National Register of Historic Places. Architect Frank Lloyd Wright called the Wainwright Building "the very first human expression of a tall steel office-building as Architecture."

The building is currently owned by the State of Missouri and houses state offices.

In May 2013 it was listed by an episode of the PBS series 10 That Changed America as one of "10 Buildings That Changed America" because it was "the first skyscraper that truly looked the part" with Sullivan being dubbed the "Father of Skyscrapers."

Commission, design and construction
The Wainwright building was commissioned by Ellis Wainwright, a St. Louis brewer. Wainwright needed office space to manage the St Louis Brewers Association. It was the second major commission for a tall building won by the Adler & Sullivan firm, which had grown to international prominence after the creation of the ten-story Auditorium Building in Chicago (designed in 1886 and completed in 1889). As designed, the first floor of the Wainwright Building was intended for street-accessible shops, with the second floor filled with easily accessible public offices. The higher floors were for "honeycomb" offices, while the top floor was for water tanks and building machinery.

Architecture
Aesthetically, the Wainwright Building exemplifies Sullivan's theories about the tall building, which included a tripartite (three-part) composition (base-shaft-attic) based on the structure of the classical column, and his desire to emphasize the height of the building. He wrote: "[The skyscraper] must be tall, every inch of it tall. The force and power of altitude must be in it the glory and pride of exaltation must be in it. It must be every inch a proud and soaring thing, rising in sheer exultation that from bottom to top it is a unit without a single dissenting line." His 1896 article cited his Wainwright Building as an example. Despite the classical column concept, the building's design was deliberately modern, featuring none of the neoclassical style that Sullivan held in contempt.

Historian Carl W. Condit described the Wainwright as "a building with a strong, vigorously articulated base supporting a screen that constitutes a vivid image of powerful upward movement." The base contained retail stores that required wide glazed openings; Sullivan's ornament made the supporting piers read as pillars. Above it the semi-public nature of offices up a single flight of stairs are expressed as broad windows in the curtain wall. A cornice separates the second floor from the grid of identical windows of the screen wall, where each window is "a cell in a honeycomb, nothing more". The building's windows and horizontals were inset slightly behind columns and piers, as part of a "vertical aesthetic" to create what Sullivan called "a proud and soaring thing." This perception has since been criticized as the skyscraper was designed to make money, not to serve as a symbol.

The ornamentation for the building includes a wide frieze below the deep cornice, which expresses the formalized yet naturalistic celery-leaf foliage typical of Sullivan and published in his System of Architectural Ornament, decorated spandrels between the windows on the different floors and an elaborate door surround at the main entrance. "Apart from the slender brick piers, the only solids of the wall surface are the spandrel panels between the windows. ... . They have rich decorative patterns in low relief, varying in design and scale with each story." The frieze is pierced by unobtrusive bull's-eye windows that light the top-story floor, originally containing water tanks and elevator machinery. The building includes embellishments of terra cotta, a building material that was gaining popularity at the time of construction.

One of Sullivan's primary concerns was the development of an architectural symbolism consisting of simple geometric, structural forms and organic ornamentation. The Wainwright Building where he juxtaposed the objective-tectonic and the subjective-organic was the first demonstration of this symbolism.

Unlike Sullivan, Adler described the building as a "plain business structure" stating:

In a utilitarian age like ours it is safe to assume that the real-estate owner and the investor in buildings will continue to erect the class of buildings from which the greatest possible revenue can be obtained with the least possible outlay ... The purpose of erecting buildings other than those required for the shelter of their owners is specifically that of making investments for profit.

The building is considered the first skyscraper to forgo the normal ornamentation used on skyscrapers at the time.

Some architectural elements from the building have been removed in renovations and taken to the Sauget, Illinois storage site of the National Building Arts Center.

History
Upon its initial completion, the Wainwright Building was "popular with the people" and received "favorably" by critics.

In 1968, the building was designated as a National Historic Landmark and in 1972 it was named a city landmark.

The Wainwright building was initially rescued from demolition by the National Trust for Historic Preservation when the Trust took an option on the structure. Later, it was acquired by Missouri as part of a state office complex and the St. Louis Landmarks Association, in one of its early victories, is credited with having rescued the Wainwright Building from a construction project.

The neighboring Lincoln Trust building (later known as the Title Guaranty building; designed by Eames and Young, built in 1898 at 706 Chestnut St.) was demolished to make way for the Gateway Mall in 1983. Carolyn Toft, Landmarks Association's executive director, stated that this building "... formed an ensemble with three other late-19th century commercial buildings, including [the Wainwright Building], that could not be equaled anywhere else in the country. Saving the Wainwright was important, but how much more important it would have been to save the entire group." Architect John D. Randall led an extensive letter-writing campaign to the governor and other noted officials; the campaign resulted in the restoration of the building as a state office building instead of its demolition.

After a period of neglect, the building now houses Missouri state offices.

See also
 List of tallest buildings in St. Louis
 National Register of Historic Places listings in St. Louis, Missouri
 List of National Historic Landmarks in Missouri

Notes

References

Sources

External links

 Images and architectural information
 

Office buildings completed in 1891
Louis Sullivan buildings
National Historic Landmarks in Missouri
Skyscraper office buildings in St. Louis
Landmarks of St. Louis
Chicago school architecture in Missouri
National Register of Historic Places in St. Louis
Downtown St. Louis
1891 establishments in Missouri
Buildings and structures in St. Louis